The 2003 UCLA Bruins football team represented the University of California, Los Angeles in the 2003 NCAA Division I-A football season.  They played their home games at the Rose Bowl in Pasadena, California and were led by Karl Dorrell. It was Dorrell's first season as the UCLA head coach.  UCLA was ranked #20 by College Football News in the preseason polls.  The Bruins finished 6–7 overall, and were tied for fifth place in the Pacific-10 Conference with a 4–4 record.  The Bruins were invited to play in the Silicon Valley Football Classic vs. Fresno State on December 30, 2003.

Schedule

Game summaries

Colorado

Sources:

Illinois

Sources:

Oklahoma

Sources:

Oklahoma's Antonio Perkins set an NCAA record for punt return yards in a game with 277 yards on seven returns.  He also set an NCAA record with three punt returns for touchdowns in a game.

San Diego State

Sources:

Washington

Sources:

Arizona

Sources:

California

Sources:

Arizona State

Sources:

Maurice Drew's 83-yard touchdown run tied for ninth longest run from scrimmage in UCLA history,  with Derek Ayers (1993 vs. BYU) and Jackie Robinson (1939 vs. Oregon). It was also the longest run from scrimmage by a true freshman in UCLA history. This was Drew's first 100-yard game. It was the 12th time in UCLA history a true freshman has reached the 100-yard mark and it was the first since DeShaun Foster in 1998 (109 yards on 15 carries vs. USC).

Stanford

Sources:

Washington State

Sources:

Oregon

Sources:

USC

Sources:

Fresno State (Silicon Valley Football Classic)

Sources:

Roster

References

UCLA
UCLA Bruins football seasons
UCLA Bruins football